Fernand Joseph St Germain (January 9, 1928 – August 16, 2014) was an American politician from    Rhode Island. He was a member of the Democratic Party and served in the Rhode Island House of Representatives and the United States House of Representatives. He is best known for his sponsorship of the Garn–St. Germain Depository Institutions Act, which deregulated the savings and loan industry.

Early life
Born in Blackstone, Massachusetts, he was raised and attended parochial schools in Woonsocket, Rhode Island. He graduated from Our Lady of Providence Seminary High School, 1945, and from Providence College in 1948. He served in the United States Army as a pharmacy and laboratory technician from 1949 to 1952. St Germain did not spell his name with a period saying that he was no saint.

Career
In 1952, at the age of 24, St Germain won a seat in the Rhode Island House of Representatives. Three years later, he graduated from Boston University Law School and was admitted to the bar.

In 1960, he was elected to Congress, where he would serve 14 terms. He later joined the Committee on Banking, Finance, and Urban Affairs, becoming the committee chairman in 1981. In 1982, he and Senator Jake Garn sponsored the Garn–St. Germain Depository Institutions Act. One of the act’s primary features was its deregulation of the savings and loan industry. Although the provisions of the act were to protect thrift savings institutions from rapidly rising interest rates by allowing them to offer new deposit accounts and make additional types of loans, its loosening of regulations arguably precipitated the Savings and loan crisis.
 
In 1985, St Germain was accused of using his office for personal benefit. The Wall Street Journal published an investigation into the Congressman’s finances. The Journal examined his financial disclosures and found that he was able to secure no-down-payment loans of $1.3 million to acquire several International House of Pancakes restaurants even though he only had a salary of $42,500 per year.

An aide in St Germain’s office contacted federal regulators repeatedly about the application of Florida Federal Savings and Loan to convert to stock ownership. After the application was approved, St Germain made a $15,000 investment in the company’s stock. The chairman of the S&L told the Journal that he did offer St Germain access to real estate deals not available to the general public but contended that he did not request assistance with the application.

Although the Justice Department and the House Ethics Committee both declined to pursue charges against him, the controversy factored into his 1986 and 1988 re-election efforts. In 1986, Republican John Holmes gave him his first tough race in many years, taking 42% of the vote. But St Germain had to spend more than twice what he had in the prior election. Holmes attacked him for taking $35,000 from a developer.

Republican Ron Machtley defeated him in November 1988 in a campaign that was notable for Machtley taking a live pig named "Les Pork" on the campaign trail to emphasize his commitment to reducing pork barrel spending by Congress.

Death
A resident of Newport, Rhode Island, St Germain died of kidney failure on August 16, 2014 at his home in Newport.

Award and honors
1985 : Honorary degree from Brown University (LL.D.)

See also
List of members of the American Legion

References

External links

1928 births
2014 deaths
20th-century American politicians
20th-century American lawyers
American people of French-Canadian descent
Boston University School of Law alumni
Democratic Party members of the Rhode Island House of Representatives
People from Woonsocket, Rhode Island
Providence College alumni
Rhode Island lawyers
Savings and loan crisis
United States Army soldiers
Democratic Party members of the United States House of Representatives from Rhode Island